The Central District of Masjed Soleyman County is a district (bakhsh) in Masjed Soleyman County, Khuzestan Province, Iran. At the 2006 census, its population was 110,192, in 23,190 families. The district has one city: Masjed Soleyman. The district has one rural district (dehestan): Jahangiri Rural District.

References 

Masjed Soleyman County
Districts of Khuzestan Province